Parrot OS is a Linux distribution based on Debian with a focus on security, privacy, and development.

Core 

Parrot is based on Debian's "testing" branch, with a Linux 5.10 kernel. It follows a rolling release development model.

The desktop environments is MATE, and the default display manager is LightDM.

The system is certified to run on devices which have a minimum of 256MB of RAM, and it is suitable for both 32-bit (i386) and 64-bit (amd64) processor architectures. Moreover, the project is available for ARMv7 (armhf) architectures. 

In June 2017, the Parrot Team announced they were considering to change from Debian to Devuan, mainly because of problems with systemd.

As of January 21st, 2019, the Parrot team has begun to phase out the development of their 32-bit (i386) ISO.

In August 2020, the Parrot OS officially supports Lightweight Xfce Desktop.

Editions
Parrot has multiple editions that are based upon Debian, with various desktop environments available.

Parrot Security 
Parrot is intended to provide a suite of penetration testing tools to be used for attack mitigation, security research, forensics, and vulnerability assessment. 

It is designed for penetration testing, vulnerability assessment and mitigation, computer forensics and anonymous web browsing.

Parrot Home

Parrot Home is the base edition of Parrot designed for daily use, and it targets regular users who need a "lightweight" system on their laptops or workstations.

The distribution is useful for daily work. Parrot Home also includes programs to chat privately with people, encrypt documents, or browse the internet anonymously. The system can also be used as a starting point to build a system with a custom set of security tools.

Parrot ARM

Parrot ARM is a lightweight Parrot release for embedded systems. It is currently available for Raspberry Pi devices.

Parrot Architect & IoT 
ParrotOS with nothing pre-installed. Install any software and DE with this edition.

Parrot OS Tools 
There are multiple Tools in Parrot OS which are specially designed for Security Researchers and are related to penetration testing. A few of them are listed below, more can be found on the official website.

Tor 

Tor, also known as The Onion Router, is a distributed network that anonymizes Internet browsing. It is designed in a way that the IP Address of the client using Tor is hidden from the server that the client is visiting. Also, the data and other details are hidden from the client’s Internet Service Provider (ISP). Tor network uses hops to encrypt the data between the client and the server. Tor network and Tor browser are pre-installed and configured in Parrot OS.

Onion Share 
Onion Share is an open-source utility that can be used to share files of any size over the Tor network securely and anonymously. Onion Share then generates a long random URL that can be used by the recipient to download the file over the TOR network using TOR browser.

AnonSurf 
Anonsurf is a utility that makes the operating system communication go over Tor or other anonymizing networks. According to Parrot, AnonSurf secures your web browser and anonymizes your IP.

See also 
 BackBox
 BlackArch
 Devuan
 Kali Linux
 List of digital forensics tools
 Security-focused operating system

Notes

External links 

Official Website
Blog & Release Notes
DistroWatch
Debian Derivatives Census

Debian-based distributions
Computer security software
Pentesting software toolkits
Rolling Release Linux distributions
Linux distributions